Jeff Mooring is an American retired actor. He is best known for portraying Dave on the television series Sports Night. He also appeared on The West Wing, The Nanny, Murphy Brown, The Hit List, The Cosby Show and others.

Early life and education 
Mooring was born in Norfolk, Virginia, and attended the University of North Carolina School of the Arts. After moving to New York city, he briefly studied dance at the Alvin Ailey American Dance Theater.

Career 
He worked as a backup dancer and singer for Mexican pop singer Celi Bee and toured with Broadway productions of West Side Story, Swing!, Evita and others. He later appeared in a small role on The Cosby Show and began appearing in television.

Filmography

Film

Television

External links

 Listing on TV.com

References 

Year of birth missing (living people)
Living people